Charlie Colgan (9 February 1878 – 25 July 1935) was an Australian rules footballer who played with South Melbourne in the Victorian Football League (VFL).

At the end of the 1899 season, in the process of naming his own "champion player", the football correspondent for The Argus ("Old Boy"), selected a team of the best players of the 1899 VFL competition:Backs: Maurie Collins (Essendon), Bill Proudfoot (Collingwood), Peter Burns (Geelong); Halfbacks: Pat Hickey (Fitzroy), George Davidson (South Melbourne), Alf Wood (Melbourne); Centres: Fred Leach (Collingwood), Firth McCallum (Geelong), Harry Wright (Essendon); Wings: Charlie Pannam (Collingwood), Eddie Drohan (Fitzroy), Herb Howson (South Melbourne); Forwards: Bill Jackson (Essendon), Eddy James (Geelong), Charlie Colgan (South Melbourne); Ruck: Mick Pleass (South Melbourne), Frank Hailwood (Collingwood), Joe McShane (Geelong); Rovers: Dick Condon (Collingwood), Bill McSpeerin (Fitzroy), Teddy Rankin (Geelong).From those he considered to be the three best players — that is, Condon, Hickey, and Pleass — he selected Pat Hickey as his "champion player" of the season. ('Old Boy', "Football: A Review of the Season", (Monday, 18 September 1899), p.6).

Notes

External links 

1878 births
1935 deaths
Australian rules footballers from Melbourne
Sydney Swans players
West Melbourne Football Club players
People from South Melbourne